Bauxite pneumoconiosis, is a progressive form of pneumoconiosis usually caused by occupational exposure to bauxite fumes which contain aluminium and silica particulates.

It is typically seen in workers involved in the smelting of bauxite to produce corundum.

Presentation
Initially, the disease appears as alveolitis, and then progresses to emphysema.

Patients may develop pneumothorax (collapsed lung).

Diagnosis
Diagnosis depends on chest X-rays, lung function tests, and history.

Treatment

References

External links 

Lung diseases due to external agents